Yusuf Öztürk may refer to:

Yusuf Öztürk (boxer) (born 1973), Turkish light heavyweight
Yusuf Öztürk (footballer) (born 1979), Turkish midfielder

See also
Öztürk (name)